Ferry Weertman (born 27 June 1992) is a former Dutch competitive swimmer who specialises in long-distance freestyle and open water events. He is the Olympic gold medalist in the 10 km open water marathon at the 2016 Olympics in Rio de Janeiro.

Career
In 2014, he became the European champion in the 10 km open water event. At the 2015 World Championships he won a silver medal in the same event.

Weertman was voted 2015 European Open water swimmer of the year by European swimming federation LEN.

In 2016, Weertman won the 10 kilometer event at the 2016 European open water swimming championships in Hoorn, the Netherlands. He finished 5th in the 5 km time trial.

A month later, on 16 August 2016, he won the gold medal in the 10 km open water marathon at the 2016 Summer Olympics, outtouching two-time world champion Spyridon Gianniotis in a photo finish.

Personal life
In 2019, Weertman got engaged to his girlfriend of approximately 5 years, Ranomi Kromowidjojo who is also a Dutch swimmer.

References

External links

 
 
 
 
 

1992 births
Living people
Dutch male freestyle swimmers
Dutch male long-distance swimmers
World Aquatics Championships medalists in swimming
European Aquatics Championships medalists in swimming
World Aquatics Championships medalists in open water swimming
People from Naarden
Olympic swimmers of the Netherlands
Swimmers at the 2016 Summer Olympics
Medalists at the 2016 Summer Olympics
Olympic gold medalists for the Netherlands
Olympic gold medalists in swimming
Knights of the Order of Orange-Nassau
21st-century Dutch people
Sportspeople from North Holland